Physical culture was a health and fitness movement from the 19th century.

Physical Culture may also refer to:

 Physical Culture (Sandow magazine), a magazine founded in 1898 by Eugen Sandow, later renamed Sandow's Magazine of Physical Culture
 Physical Culture (Macfadden magazine), a magazine founded in 1899 by Bernarr Macfadden